Zito may refer to:
 Zito (surname)
 Žito (fl. 14th century), Bohemian court magician
 Zito (footballer, born 1932) (1932–2015), born José Ely de Miranda, Brazilian football midfielder
 Zito (footballer, born 1971), born Helmer da Piedade Rosa, Angolan football midfielder
 Zito Luvumbo (born 2002), Angolan football winger
 Zito, Tibet, Tibetan town